MIT University, Meghalaya (formerly known as University of Technology and Management, Shillong) is a state private university established in 2011, in accordance with Section 3 of the UGC Act. The university is located in Shillong, the state capital of Meghalaya, within the union of India. It is the first Indian university to introduce cloud computing engineering as a field of study, in collaboration with IBM.

MIT University, Meghalaya is part of the MIT Group of Institutions.

Academics 
It offers specialized programs in travel, tourism, finance, retail, engineering and technology sectors. The academic courses at MIT University, Shillong include BBA in Digital Marketing, Hospitality Travel and Tourism, Finance, Marketing and Retail and BTech in cloud computing and Oil and Gas Informatics.

Former Pro Vice Chancellors
 Dr. S.N Suri (2010-2013)
 Professor Avinash Singh (2013-2014)
 Dr. Mukesh Saxena (2014–2017)
 Dr. Debmalya Bhattacharya(2017–present)

References

External links 
 
 
 IBM & UTM Collaboration.
 Reasons to Join UTM, Shillong.
 https://www.thefela.org/experts/details/prof-dr-malhar-pangrikar
 
 
 

Universities in Meghalaya
Fashion schools in India
Education in Shillong
Engineering colleges in Meghalaya
2011 establishments in Meghalaya
Educational institutions established in 2011